Joy Ellen Kitzmiller (born May 12, 1964 in Manhattan Beach, California) is an American badminton player who played Badminton at the 1992 Summer Olympics.

Career 
She started playing in tournaments at 11 and began having real success at 13. In 1981 she won the girl's single division at the junior Nationals. She credited badminton for getting her to Stanford University. She went on to wins at the U.S. National Badminton Championships and qualifying for the Olympics. At that time her international ranking was just 98th due to the US not traditionally being a power in the sport. Her mother Ruth also had a long time interest in the sport. Joy competed in a "Seniors Event" in 2008.

References

External links
 
 
 

American female badminton players
Badminton players at the 1992 Summer Olympics
Sportspeople from Manhattan Beach, California
Stanford University alumni
1964 births
Olympic badminton players of the United States
Living people
21st-century American women